This is a list of works by the illustrator and theatrical designer Aubrey Hammond.

List of plays featuring scenery and/or costumes designed by Hammond
 Oh!Hell!!, Reginald Arkell , Russell Thorndike, Jose Levy, Little Theatre (Grand Guignol), London, 1920.
 Just Fancy-A Revue, C.B. Cochran, London, 1921.
 In the Street, The Kingsway Theatre, London, 1921.
 Now and Then, The Vaudeville, London, 1921.
 The Man with a Load of Mischief, Ashley Dukes, The Haymarket, London, 1921. Also New York, 1925.
 The Rose and The Ring, The Playhouse, Liverpool, 1923.
 The Magic Sword, The Playhouse, Liverpool, 1923.
 Man and the Masses, The New Theatre, London, 1924.
 Puppets, André Charlot, The Vaudeville, London, 1924.
 Husband Love, Folkestone, 1924.
 Tess of the D’Urbervilles, Barnes Theatre, 1925
 The London Review, Norman Lee, Lyceum Theatre, 1925.
 The Forcing House, The Little Theatre, London, 1926.
 The Yellow Mask, Theatre Royal, Birmingham, 1927.
 Sylvia, The Vaudeville, London, 1927.
 The White Chateau, Everyman Theatre, Hampstead, London, 1927.
 One More River, New Theatre, London, 1927.
 One Dam Thing After Another, London Pavilion, London, 1927.
 Such Men Are Dangerous, Ashley Dukes, The Duke of York's Theatre, London, 1928.
 No Other Tiger, A.E.W. Mason, Prince of Wales Theatre, Birmingham, 1928.
 The Fountain Head, Ashley Dukes, The Arts Theatre, London, 1928.
 Song of the Sea, Arthur Wimperis & Lauri Wylie, His Majesty's Theatre, London, 1928.
 A Man with Red Hair, Benn W. Levy, Little Theatre, London, 1928.
 Mr. Pickwick, Cosmo Hamilton & Frank C. Reilly, The Haymarket, London, 1928.
 Her Past, Frederick Jackson, Lewisham Hippodrome, London, 1928.
 The Devil's Host, Carl Glick/Archibald Nettlefold, The Comedy Theatre, London, 1928.
 Red Rust, Frank Vernon, Little Theatre, London, 1929.
 The Roof, John Galsworthy, Basil Dean, The Vaudeville, London, 1929.
 Coo-Ee, Laurie Wylie/Melvin Gideon, Kingston Theatre, Kinston-Upon-Thames, London, 1929.
 Measure for Measure, Haymarket, London, 1929.
 Quality Street, J. M. Barrie, Haymarket, London, 1929.
 The Ivory Door, A.A. Milne, Haymarket, London, 1929.
 Jew Suss, Ashley Dukes/Lion Feuchtwanger, Her Majesty's Opera House, Blackpool, 1929.
 Bees and Honey, H. F. Maltby, New Theatre, London, 1929.
 Yesterday's Harvest, Margaret Pedlar(?)/Gladys St. John-Loe(?), The Apollo, London, 1929,
 The Circle of Chalk, James Laver/Basil Dean, New Theatre, London, 1929.
 French Leave, Archie de Bear/Reginald Berkeley, The Vaudeville, London, 1929.
 The House that Jack Built, Jack Hulbert, Adelphi Theatre, London, 1929.
 Charivaria, Melville Gideon, Prince of Wales Theatre, Birmingham, 1929.
 The Stag, Beverley Nichols, The Globe, London, 1929.
 The First Mrs. Fraser, St. John Ervine, The Haymarket, London, 1929.
 The Co-Optimists of 1930, Greatrex Newman, The Hippodrome, London, 1930.
 Down Our Street/Belle, Ernest George, The Vaudeville, London, 1930.
 Topaze, Marcel Pagnol/Benn Levy, King's Theatre, Glasgow, 1930.
 Hamlet, Horace Watson/Shakespeare, The Haymarket, London, 1930.
 Machines, Reginald Berkeley, The Arts Theatre Club, London, 1930.
 Little Catherine, Alfred Savior/Virginia & Frank Law, The Phoenix Theatre, London, 1931.
 Colonel Satan, Booth Tarkington, The Haymarket, London, 1931.
 Off the Map, Herbert Jones/Jose Levy, The Little Theatre, London, 1931.
 Frailties, Dion Titheradge, The Phoenix, London, 1931.
 Shanghai Nights, B.A. Mayer, The Empire Theatre, London, 1931.
 Vile Bodies, Evelyn Waugh/Nigel Playfair, The Arts Club, London, 1931.
 Kong, Harold Kingsley/Oscar Ashe, Cambridge Theatre, Cambridge, 1931.
 O.H.M.S., Reginald Berkeley, The New Theatre, London, 1931.
 Max and Mr. Max, Cecil Madden/Jose Lopez Rubio, The Vaudeville, London, 1931.
 Take Two from One, Harley Granville-Barker, The Haymarket, London, 1931.
 Wild Violets, Bruno Hardt-Warden, Drury Lane Theatre, London, 1932.
 Once a Husband, Margot Neville & Brett Haye, The Haymarket, London, 1932.
 Julius Caesar and Twelfth Night, William Shakespeare, The Shakespeare Memorial Theatre, Stratford-Upon-Avon, 1932.
 Wild Violets, Hassard Short, Drury Lane Theatre, London, 1932.
 The Last of Mrs. Cheyney, Frederick Lonsdale, The Tower Arms, Iver, Buckinghamshire, 1932.
 Merchant of Venice, William Shakespeare, The Shakespeare Memorial Theatre, Stratford-Upon-Avon, 1932.
 The Dubarry, Eric Maschwitz, His Majesty's Theatre, London, 1932.
 Double Harness, Edward Poor Montgomery, Leeds Grand Theatre, Leeds, 1933.
 The Ace, Hermann Rossman/Miles Malleson, Lyric Theatre, London, 1933.
 Ballerina, Rodney Ackland, The Gaiety Theatre, London, 1933.
 After Dark, Ronald Jeans, The Vaudeville, London, 1933.
 This Side Idolatry, Talbot Jennings, The Lyric Theatre, London, 1933.
 Acropolis, Robert E. Sherwood, The Lyric Theatre, London. 1933.
 The Rats of Norway, Keith Winter, The Playhouse, 1933.
 On Approval, Frederick Lonsdale, The Strand Theatre, London, 1933.
 Mr. Whittington, Jack Waller and Jack Buchanan, The Alhambra, Glasgow, 1933.
 Before Sunset, Gerhardt Hauptmann/Miles Malleson, The Shaftesbury Theatre, London, 1933.
 The Tempest, Love's Labour Lost, Julius Caesar, Henry V, Shakespeare Memorial Theatre, Stratford-upon-Avon, 1934.
 Touch Wood, C.L. Anthony (Dodie Smith), The Haymarket Theatre, London, 1934.
 The Shinning Hour, Keith Winter, St. James's Theatre, London, 1934.
 The Wise Woman, Leslie Storm, The Criterion, London, 1934.
 Anthony and Cleopatra, The Merchant of Venice, As You Like It, Henry IV, The Tempest, All's Well That Ends Well, Shakespeare Memorial Theatre, Stratford-Upon-Avon, 1935.
 Accidentally Yours, Maurice Hennequin/Richard Grey, Theatre Royal Birmingham, 1935.
 The Ringmaster, Keith Winter, Shaftesbury, London, 1935.
 Vintage Wine, Seymour Hicks/Ashley Dukes, The Victoria Palace Theatre, London, 1935.
 Worse Things Happen at Sea, Keith Winter, Opera House, Manchester, 1935.
 Much Ado About Nothing, The Merchant of Venice, The Taming of the Shrew, Shakespeare Memorial Theatre, Stratford-Upon-Avon, 1936.
 Winter Opera Season, Sir Thomas Beecham/Music Drama Company, Convent Garden, 1936.
 Heart's Content, W. Chetham Strode/Raymond Massey, The Shaftesbury Theatre, London, 1936.
 The Amazing Dr. Clitterhouse, Barré Lyndon, The Haymarket Theatre, London, 1936.
 Wise Tomorrow, Stephen Powys, The Lyric Theatre, London, 1937.
 London After Dark, Walter Hackett, The Apollo Theatre, London, 1937.
 The Laughing Cavalier, Reginald Arkell/Stafford Byrne, The Adelphi Theatre, London, 1937.
 Orchard Walls, Merton Hodge, St. James’ Theatre, London, 1937.
 Don Juan de Manara, Eugene Goossen, Convent Garden, London, 1937.
 Henry V, Shakespeare Memorial Theatre, Stratford-Upon-Avon, 1937.
 To Have and To Hold, Lionel Brown, The Haymarket, 1937.
 I Can Take It, Theatre Royal, Birmingham, 1939.
 Giving the Bride Away, St. Martin's Theatre, London, 1939.
 Come to Play, Jessie Matthews/Sonnie Hale, The Phoenix Theatre, 1940.

List of cinema and television productions designed by Hammond
 Hyde Park Corner, Walter C. Hackett/Sinclair Hill, Grosvenor Films, Welwyn Studios, U.K., 1935.
 The Cardinal, D.B. Wyndham-Lewis/Sinclair Hill, Grosvenor Films, Welwyn Studies, U.K., 1936.
 Mr. Pickwick, Albert Coates, BBC, Alexandra Palace, London, 1936.
 Housemaster, Ian Hay, The Apollo Theatre, London, 1936.
 Take A Chance, Sinclair Hall/D.B. Wyndham-Lewis, Grosvenor Films, 1936.
 The Gay Adventure, Monty Banks/D.B. Wyndham-Lewis, Grosvenor Films, 1936.
 Books Containing Illustrations and/or Covers Designed by Hammond
 Louis Golding, Seacoast of Bohemia, 1923.
 Lewis Melville, Beau Brummell: His Life and Letters, 1924.
 Lewis Melville, The London Scene, 1926.
 Lewis Melville, Regency Ladies, 1926.
 Lewis Melville, The Star of Piccadilly, 1927.
 Lewis Melville, Maids of Honour, 1927.
 Lewis Melville, The Windsor Beauties, 1928.
 Lewis Melville, Not All the Truth, 1928.
 Hayter Preston, Collisions, 1924.
 Peter Triall, Under the Cherry Tree, 1926.
 Magdalen King-Hall, I Think I Remember, 1927.
 Nash's and Pall Mall, Magazine, Illustrations by Hammond, 1926.
 Annual Stage Guild Ball, (Programme Illustrations)), 1927.
 Malcolm Douglas Lyon, A Village Match and After, (London: Eveleigh, Nash & Grayson) 1929.
 Henry Savage, How to Manage Our Women, (London: Humphrey Toulmin) 1930.
 Reginald le May, Siamese Tales: Old and New, (London: Noel Douglas) 1930.
 William Henry Leverton, Through the Box-Office Window: Fifty Years at the Haymarket Theatre,(London: T.W. Laurie Ltd), 1932.
 Maynard Greville, A Diary of Mister Niggs, (London: Ivor Nicholson & Watson), 1932.

Selected exhibitions
 Poster Exhibition, Solo, Bond Street,
 Poster Exhibition, Solo, Derby Art Gallery, 1927.
 Poster Exhibition, Contributor, Victoria and Albert Museum, 1931.
 Exhibition of Stage and Costume Designs, The Redfern Gallery, Cork Street, London, 1938.
 International Theatre Art, Imperial Palace, Vienna, Austria, 1936.
 The Theatre Art Exhibition, Winnipeg, Canada, 1938.

Selected posters and advertising
 Ramsgate, Hoarding and Rail tourism advertisement, 1926.
 Bolshewitches, Unionist Party,
 Advert for London Underground- To the Concert Hall,
 Curtain for the Lyceum Theatre, 1925, caricatures of well-known men and women, including Lloyd George, Churchill, Balfour, and Lady Astor and Oxford. Illustrated in the Sphere
 Advert for Sarony Cigarettes (graphic illustration of dancers)
 Surround Window Poster, James Moon’s shop, London, 1925.
 Canadian Club Whiskey, Newspaper Advertisement Series, ‘In Victoria’s Days’, 1926. And Others.
 Barclay’s Lager, Print Advertisement, 1925.
 Illustrations for The Bystander,
 Illustrations for The Graphic,
 Canadian Club Whiskey, 27 Cockspur Street, ‘distinctive to the nth degree’ 
 Model Scenery and Costume Design, Blackfriars Theatre, London, 1927.
 The Pow-Pow, (Hector Powe Ltd), Illustrations, 1930.
 Ideal homes Exhibition, ‘Famous Rooms from Literary Fiction.’, Olympia, London, 1931.
 Theatre Advertising Poster, ‘Millie’ and ‘The Queen’s Husband’, London Underground, 1931.
 Cadbury’s Chocolate Box Design, 1932.
 Sands Across the Sea, Southern Railway Company. Holiday Guide/Travel Guide, 1938.
 Brighton Official Handbook, Brighton Corporation Publicity Department, 1938-9.

References

Hammond, Aubrey